Knut Knudsen (born 12 October 1950) is a retired Norwegian road and track cyclist. As an amateur, he placed fifth in the 4000m individual pursuit at the 1968 Olympics before becoming Olympic champion in the same discipline in 1972. He would follow this up with another gold at the 1973 World Championships. At the 1972 Olympics he also placed fifth in the 100 km team time trial on the road. He won the Norwegian National Road Race Championships in 1972 and 1973.

In 1974 he turned professional and cycled in Italy until 1981. He won six stages of the Giro d'Italia and wore the Maglia Rosa leader's jersey twice, becoming the first and so far only Norwegian to do so. The first time he held the pink leader jersey was for two stages after winning Stage 1 of the 1975 Giro d'Italia on 17 May, Norway's constitution day. In 1981 he could once again put on the pink jersey after winning the prologue. After finishing second in the race three times, Knudsen won Tirreno–Adriatico in 1979. He was chosen the world's best time trial cyclist by two biggest sporting magazines from 1979 to 1981. In total he won 49 professional races.

Major results

1966
 1st  Individual pursuit, National Junior Track Championships
1967
 1st  Individual pursuit, National Junior Track Championships
1968
 1st  Road race, National Junior Road Championships
 1st Road race, Nordic Junior Road Championships
 2nd Team time trial, Nordic Road Championships
1969
 National Track Championships
1st  Kilo
1st  Individual pursuit
1972
 1st  Individual pursuit, Olympic Games
 National Road Championships
1st  Road race
1st  Time trial
 National Track Championships
1st  Kilo
1st  Individual pursuit
 Nordic Amateur Road Championships
1st Road race
2nd Team time trial
1973
 1st  Individual pursuit, UCI Amateur Track World Championships
 National Road Championships
1st  Road race
1st  Time trial
 National Track Championships
1st  Kilo
1st  Individual pursuit
 2nd Team time trial, Nordic Amateur Road Championships
1974
 1st Stage 5b Tour de Romandie
 2nd Overall Tirreno–Adriatico
1975
Giro d'Italia
 1st Stage 1 
 Held  after Stages 1–2
 Held  after Stage 1
 2nd  Individual pursuit, UCI Track World Championships
 2nd Overall Tirreno–Adriatico
1st Stage 5
 3rd Overall Tour de Romandie
 3rd Overall Giro di Sardegna
1976
 1st Stage 1 Tour de Romandie
 3rd  World Championship, Track, Pursuit, Elite
1977
 1st Stage 9 Giro d'Italia
 1st Stage 5 Tirreno–Adriatico
 2nd  World Championship, Track, Pursuit, Elite
 3rd Overall Tour de Romandie
1st Stage 4b
1978
 1st Overall Giro di Sardegna
1st Stage 3
 1st Overall Giro della Provincia di Reggio Calabria
 1st Trofeo Laigueglia
 1st Trofeo Baracchi (with Roy Schuiten)
 2nd Overall Tirreno–Adriatico
1st Stage 5
 3rd Trofeo Pantalica
1979
 1st  Overall Tirreno–Adriatico
1st Stage 5
 1st   Overall Giro del Trentino
1st Prologue
 Tour de Romandie
1st Stages 3 & 5b
 Giro d'Italia
 1st Stage 10 
 Held  after Stage 1
 2nd Giro del Lazio
 3rd Milan–San Remo
1980
 1st Stage 1a Paris–Nice
 1st Stage 4b Tour de Romandie
 1st Prologue Deutschland Tour
 1st GP Eddy Merckx
 2nd Overall Giro di Sardegna
 3rd Trofeo Pantalica
1981
 Giro d'Italia
1st Prologue, Stage 13 & 23a
 Held  after Prologue
 Held  after Prologue
 1st Prologue Paris–Nice
 1st GP Eddy Merckx
 2nd Trofeo Baracchi

Results timeline

Major championships results timeline

References

External links

 

1950 births
Living people
Norwegian male cyclists
Olympic gold medalists for Norway
Olympic cyclists of Norway
Cyclists at the 1968 Summer Olympics
Cyclists at the 1972 Summer Olympics
Olympic medalists in cycling
Norwegian Giro d'Italia stage winners
People from Levanger
Medalists at the 1972 Summer Olympics
Norwegian track cyclists
Sportspeople from Trøndelag